Sigvald Oppebøen Hansen (born 21 September 1950 in Nissedal) is a Norwegian politician for the Labour Party.

He was elected to the Norwegian Parliament from Telemark in 1993, and has been re-elected on three occasions.

On the local level was a member of Nissedal municipality council from 1983 to 1987, and of Telemark county council from 1983 to 1993.

Before entering politics, he worked as a mail carrier and has attended a business school.

References

1950 births
Living people
Members of the Storting
Politicians from Telemark
People from Nissedal
Labour Party (Norway) politicians
21st-century Norwegian politicians
20th-century Norwegian politicians